Teunis Houghtaling House, also known as Vredehuis, is a historic home located at Clarksville in Albany County, New York.  It was built in two stages: the -story main block was built about 1770, expanded to a five-bay dwelling about 1790, at which time a 1-story addition was also completed.   It is constructed of hand-hewn timber framing.  Also on the property are two frame outbuildings and a small family cemetery with burials dating to the early 19th century.

It was listed on the National Register of Historic Places in 2004.

References

Houses on the National Register of Historic Places in New York (state)
Houses completed in 1770
Houses in Albany County, New York
National Register of Historic Places in Albany County, New York
1770 establishments in the Province of New York